Suan Pakkad Palace or Suan Pakkard Palace is a museum in Bangkok, Thailand. It is located on Sri Ayutthaya Road, south of the Victory Monument. The museum has Thai antiques on display, including Ban Chiang pottery which are over 4,000 years old. Originally the home of Prince Chumbhotbongs Paribatra (1904–1959) and his wife, they converted it into a museum which opened in 1952. The museum features a group of four traditional Thai houses with covered hallways between them. There is also artwork on display in its Marsi Gallery.

The name Suan Pakkad translates as "Cabbage Patch", but the museum's collection of five traditional pavilions is one of the best examples of traditional domestic architecture in the city. The Lacquer Pavilion is the most striking building, and is over 450 years old.

References

Literature 

Thailand, The National Geographic Traveler, page 95, 2001.

External links 
 Suan Pakkad Palace Museum

Former royal residences in Bangkok
Museums in Bangkok
Open-air museums in Thailand
Architecture museums
Decorative arts museums
Tourist attractions in Bangkok
Art museums and galleries in Thailand
Ratchathewi district
Art museums established in 1952
1952 establishments in Thailand